Paduka Sri Sultan Mudzaffar Shah III ibni al-Marhum Sultan Mahmud Shah II (died 3 August 1602) was the 11th Sultan of Kedah. His reign was from 1547 to 1602.

External links
 List of Sultans of Kedah

16th-century Sultans of Kedah
1602 deaths
17th-century Sultans of Kedah